Bruce Alan Lietzke (July 18, 1951 – July 28, 2018) was an American professional golfer who won 13 tournaments on the PGA Tour between 1977 and 1994, including two victories in the Canadian Open. His best finish in a major championship was at the 1991 PGA Championship where he finished second, three strokes behind John Daly. He had seven victories on the Champions Tour, including one senior major title, the 2003 U.S. Senior Open. He played in the 1981 Ryder Cup.

Early life
Lietzke was born in Kansas City, Kansas. He moved to Beaumont, Texas with his parents in 1960 and lived there until 1977, graduating from Forest Park High School in 1969.

Acknowledgments
Lietzke credited his older brother, Duane, for introducing him to the game of golf at age five. He also credits Henry Homberg, a local Beaumont professional, along with Duane for having the greatest influences on his game when he first started playing. Lietzke attended the University of Houston in Houston, Texas. He graduated in 1973 and turned pro in 1974.

Successes
Lietzke's first PGA Tour victory was in the 1977 Tucson Open. Overall Lietzke won a combined total of 20 tournaments on the PGA Tour and the Champions Tour, including the 2003 U.S. Senior Open. On the PGA Tour in 1981, Lietzke had three tournament victories. He played on the winning 1981 U.S. Ryder Cup team at Walton Heath Golf Club.

Lietzke's best finish in a major on the PGA Tour was a solo second place at the 1991 PGA Championship.

Lietzke was well known for not practicing a great deal, and not playing in a large number of tournaments compared to his fellow competitors, electing to spend more time with his family. He did not play more than 25 events in any PGA Tour season and never played more than 20 tournaments in a single season after 1988. He never finished below 74th on the money list. During his career, Lietzke played in 506 PGA Tour events.

Hobbies
Lietzke enjoyed collecting classic cars and built an 11-car garage at his home in which to store his large collection; among the crown jewels were a 1967 yellow Corvette Stingray convertible and a 1987 Buick GNX. He listed Bruce Springsteen as his favorite entertainer and Don "Big Daddy" Garlits as his favorite athlete. He made his home in Dallas, Texas. 

Lietzke was an avid supporter of the Sour Mash Open in Parkersburg, West Virginia. He played in the event numerous times. "The Bryce-Lietzke-Martin Scholarship Fund was the first fund established by the Sour Mash Open Golf Tournament Committee in 1990 in honor of the late Dr. John Coyle Bryce, PGA Golf Professional, Bruce Lietzke, and Larry Martin. The earnings of the fund are used to provide scholarships to worthy Wood County students who have shown an interest in golf."

Personal life
Lietzke and Jerry Pate were brothers-in-law. Lietzke's wife, Rose, and Pate's wife, Soozi, are sisters. Lietzke and Pate played together in the 1981 Ryder Cup.

Medical problems and death

In April 2017, Lietzke was diagnosed with an aggressive form of brain cancer called glioblastoma. He died on July 28, 2018 from complications of the disease and attempts at treating it, which his body rejected.

Professional wins (22)

PGA Tour wins (13)

PGA Tour playoff record (6–6)

Other wins (1)

Champions Tour wins (7)

*Note: The 2002 TD Waterhouse Championship was shortened to 36 holes due to rain.

Other senior wins (1)
2002 Liberty Mutual Legends of Golf - Raphael Division (with Bill Rogers)

Results in major championships

CUT = missed the half-way cut
"T" indicates a tie for a place

Summary

Most consecutive cuts made – 13 (1983 PGA – 1989 PGA)
Longest streak of top-10s – 2 (1981 Open Championship – 1981 PGA)

Results in The Players Championship

CUT = missed the halfway cut
"T" indicates a tie for a place

Senior major championships

Wins (1)

U.S. national team appearances
Ryder Cup: 1981 (winners)
UBS Cup: 2003 (tie)

See also 

 Spring 1975 PGA Tour Qualifying School graduates

References

External links

Texas Golf Hall of Fame – Bruce Lietzke

American male golfers
Houston Cougars men's golfers
PGA Tour golfers
PGA Tour Champions golfers
Ryder Cup competitors for the United States
Winners of senior major golf championships
Golfers from Kansas
Golfers from Dallas
Sportspeople from Kansas City, Kansas
Sportspeople from Beaumont, Texas
People from Athens, Texas
Forest Park High School (Beaumont, Texas) alumni
Deaths from brain tumor
1951 births
2018 deaths